Margaret Rice Cheney (born August 1, 1952) is an American politician who served as a member of the Vermont House of Representatives from 2007 until her appointment to the Vermont Public Service Board in 2013. She was the managing editor of Washingtonian from 1978 to 1989, after which she moved to Norwich, Vermont. She is married to U.S. Senator Peter Welch.

References

External links

1952 births
Living people
Harvard College alumni
Democratic Party members of the Vermont House of Representatives
21st-century American politicians
21st-century American women politicians